Wong Siu-yee, BBS, JP (born 4 July 1953, Hong Kong) was the member of the Provisional Legislative Council and the Kowloon City District Board member (1985–2003) and Urban Council (1991–94). He was also elected as member of the Election Committee in 2000 and 2006 respectively, which is an electoral college responsible for electing the Chief Executive of Hong Kong.

References

1953 births
Living people
Members of the Provisional Legislative Council
Members of the Urban Council of Hong Kong
Liberal Democratic Federation of Hong Kong politicians
Hong Kong Progressive Alliance politicians
Democratic Alliance for the Betterment and Progress of Hong Kong politicians
District councillors of Kowloon City District
Members of the Selection Committee of Hong Kong
Recipients of the Bronze Bauhinia Star